David Michael Dollé (born 30 May 1969 in Pasadena, United States) is a Swiss retired athlete who specialised in the sprinting events. He represented his country at the 1993 and 1995 World Championships reaching the semifinals on the first occasion.

Competition record

Personal bests
Outdoor
100 metres – 10.16 (+1.3 m/s) (La Chaux-de-Fonds 1995)
200 metres – 20.43 (0.0 m/s) (Meilen 1993)
Indoor
60 metres – 6.69 (Magglingen 1994)

References

External links
Official site

1969 births
Living people
Swiss male sprinters
World Athletics Championships athletes for Switzerland
Sportspeople from Pasadena, California
American emigrants to Switzerland
Swiss people of African-American descent